Operation Takeover is the seventh album by rapper, JT the Bigga Figga.  The album was initially released on a small scale in 1996 for Get Low Recordz and was produced by JT the Bigga Figga.  It was re-released commercially on June 27, 2000, making it the third of three albums JT released in 2000.

Track listing
"Intro"- 1:50 
"Extreme Danger"- 5:19 
"Northern Cali"- 4:07 
"Mobstyle Menu"- 3:56 
"Bout 2 Ball"- 4:28 
"Filthy Surroundings"- 4:48 
"Cornerstone Pimpin'"- 1:14 
"On the Daily"- 4:32 
"Checking Traps"- 6:12 
"State Penn"- 4:28 
"Fall of America"- 4:47 
"Hidden Secrets"- 4:22

References 

JT the Bigga Figga albums
2000 albums